Anne Hope Jahren (born September 27, 1969) is an American geochemist and geobiologist at the University of Oslo in Norway, known for her work using stable isotope analysis to analyze fossil forests dating to the Eocene. She has won many prestigious awards in the field, including the James B. Macelwane Medal of the American Geophysical Union.

Her book Lab Girl (2016) has been applauded as both "a personal memoir and a paean to the natural world", a literary fusion of memoir and science writing, and "a compellingly earthy narrative."

Early life and education 
Jahren was born in Austin, Minnesota on September 27, 1969. Her father taught science at a community college and she has three older brothers.  She completed her undergraduate education in geology at the University of Minnesota, graduating cum laude in 1991.

Career and research 
Jahren earned her Ph.D in 1996 at the University of California, Berkeley in the field of soil science. Her dissertation covered the formation of biominerals in plants and used novel stable isotope methods to examine the processes. From 1996 to 1999, she was an assistant professor at the Georgia Institute of Technology, then moved to Johns Hopkins University, where she stayed until 2008.

At Georgia Tech, she conducted pioneering research on paleoatmospheres using fossilized plants, and discovered the second methane hydrate release event that occurred 117 million years ago. She also spent a year on a Fulbright Award at the University of Copenhagen, learning DNA analysis techniques.

While at Johns Hopkins, Jahren received media attention for her work with the fossil forests of Axel Heiberg Island. Her studies of the trees allowed her to estimate the environmental conditions on the island 45 million years ago. She and her collaborators analyzed depletion of oxygen isotopes to determine the weather patterns there that allowed large Metasequoia forests to flourish during the Eocene. Her research at Johns Hopkins also included the first extraction and analysis of DNA found in paleosol and the first discovery of stable isotopes existing in a multicellular organism's DNA.

Jahren left Johns Hopkins for a full professorship at the University of Hawaii. Her research there focused on using stable isotope analysis to determine characteristics of the environment on different timescales.  On September 1, 2016, Jahren became the J. Tuzo Wilson Professor at the University of Oslo's Centre for Earth Evolution and Dynamics, where she studies how living and fossil organisms are chemically linked to the environment.

Honors and awards 
Jahren has received three Fulbright Awards: in 1992 for geology work conducted in Norway, in 2003 for environmental science work conducted in Denmark, and in 2010 for arctic science work conducted in Norway. In 2001, Jahren won the Donath Medal, awarded by the Geological Society of America. In 2005, she was awarded the Macelwane Medal, becoming the first woman and fourth scientist overall to win both the Macelwane Medal and the Donath Medal. Jahren was profiled by Popular Science magazine in 2006 as one of its "Brilliant 10" scientists. She was a 2013 Leopold Fellow at Stanford University's Stanford Woods Institute for the Environment. In 2016, Time Magazine named her one of the world's "100 Most Influential People." Jahren  was awarded Australian Society for Medical Research Medal for 2018. She was also elected to the Norwegian Academy of Science and Letters in 2018.

Support for science awareness 

Jahren is an advocate for raising public awareness of science and has been working to lift the stereotype surrounding women and girls in science. One such example included the repurposing of the Twitter hashtag #ManicureMondays. Seventeen magazine originally came up with the hashtag, but focused mainly on manicured and painted fingernails. Subsequently, Jahren encouraged fellow scientists, specifically girls, to tweet pictures of their hands conducting scientific experiments. The idea behind this was to raise awareness of scientific research and to increase the profile of women working in science.

Jahren has also written compellingly about the sexual harassment of women in science. She recommends that people draw strong professional boundaries, and that they carefully document what occurs, beginning with the first occasion of harassment.

References

External links 
  (Jahren lab website)
 University of Oslo faculty website
 Cogito interview with Jahren

21st-century American biologists
American geochemists
1969 births
Living people
American women geologists
American women biologists
American women chemists
University of Hawaiʻi faculty
People from Austin, Minnesota
20th-century American biologists
21st-century American chemists
20th-century American geologists
21st-century American geologists
20th-century American chemists
20th-century American women scientists
21st-century American women scientists
UC Berkeley College of Natural Resources alumni
Members of the Norwegian Academy of Science and Letters
American women academics
Fulbright alumni